The Sundial is a  elevation white Navajo Sandstone summit located in Zion National Park, in Washington County of southwest Utah, United States.

Description

Its nearest higher neighbor is The West Temple, one half mile to the southeast, and Altar of Sacrifice is set approximately one mile to the north-northeast. Other neighbors include The Witch Head, Bee Hive, The Sentinel, Mount Spry, Bridge Mountain, and Mount Kinesava. This geographical feature was named by the park's third superintendent, Preston P. Patraw, because it had long been used as a sundial to regulate clocks in the nearby town of Grafton. The Sundial's name was officially adopted in 1934 by the U.S. Board on Geographic Names.

Climate
Spring and fall are the most favorable seasons to visit The Sundial. According to the Köppen climate classification system, it is located in a Cold semi-arid climate zone, which is defined by the coldest month having an average mean temperature below , and at least 50% of the total annual precipitation being received during the spring and summer.

Gallery

See also

 List of mountains in Utah
 Geology of the Zion and Kolob canyons area
 Colorado Plateau

References

External links

 Zion National Park National Park Service
 Weather forecast
 Web cam

Mountains of Utah
Zion National Park
Mountains of Washington County, Utah
Sandstone formations of the United States
Landforms of Washington County, Utah
North American 2000 m summits